Newport Bay is an arm of Chincoteague Bay between the mainland of Worcester County, Maryland and Sinepuxent Neck; its principal tributaries are Newport Creek and Trappe Creek.

The names Newport Bay and Newport Creek refer to a tract of land on the creek, "Newport Pagnell", patented in the late 17th century, which in turn commemorated the town of the same name in Buckinghamshire.  Newport Bay has also been known as Mobjack Bay.

References

External links
 Newport Bay watershed profile

Bays of Maryland
Bodies of water of Worcester County, Maryland